Joe Hendry may refer to:

Joe Hendry (footballer), (1886–1966) Scottish footballer with Morton and Rangers
Joe Hendry (wrestler) (born 1988), Scottish wrestler